The 1908 Summer Olympics, officially the Games of the IV Olympiad, were an international multi-sport event which was held in 1908 in London. These games were originally scheduled to be held in Rome. At the time they were the fifth modern Olympic games. However, the Athens Games of 1906 have since been downgraded by the International Olympic Committee and the 1908 Games are seen as the start of the Fourth Olympiad, in keeping with the now-accepted four-year cycle. Overall, 106 events in 24 disciplines were contested.

{| id="toc" class="toc" summary="Contents"
|align="center" colspan=4|Contents
|-
|
Archery
Athletics
Boxing
Cycling
Diving
Fencing
|valign=top|
Football
Figure skating
Gymnastics
Hockey
Jeu de paume
Lacrosse
|valign=top|
Polo
Rackets
Rowing
Rugby
Sailing
Shooting
|valign=top|
Swimming
Tennis
Tug of war
Water motorsports
Water polo
Wrestling
|-
|align=center colspan=4|Statistics   See also   Notes   References   External links
|}


Archery

Athletics

Boxing

Cycling

Diving

Fencing

Figure skating

Football

Gymnastics

Hockey

Jeu de paume

Lacrosse

Polo

Rackets

Rowing

Rugby

Sailing

Shooting

Swimming

Tennis

Tug of war

Water motorsports

Water polo

Wrestling

Freestyle

Greco-Roman

Statistics

Medal leaders
Athletes who won more than two medals are listed below.

Notes

See also
1908 Summer Olympics medal table

References

External links

1908 Summer Olympics
Lists of Summer Olympic medalists by year